Arslan Ekşi (born 17 July 1985) is a Turkish volleyball player for Ziraat Bankası S.K.. He was the team's captain. He played 80 times for the national team and also played for Arçelik.

Honours and awards

Personal
 2005 Best setter of the Turkish Men's Volleyball League
 2007 Best setter of the Turkish Men's Volleyball League
 2008 Best setter of the Turkish Men's Volleyball League
 2009 Best setter of Balkan Cup
 2010 Best setter of the Turkish Men's Volleyball League
 2010 Best Turkish Player of the Turkish Men's Volleyball League
 2011 Best setter of the Turkish Men's Volleyball League
 2019 Most Valuable Player of Men's European Volleyball League

Club
 2002-03 Turkish Men's Volleyball League Champion with Arçelik
 2005 Summer Universiade Champion with Turkey
 2005-06 Turkish Men's Volleyball League runner-up with Fenerbahçe SK
 2007-08 Turkish Cup Champion with Fenerbahçe SK
 2007-08 Turkish Men's Volleyball League Champion with Fenerbahçe SK
 2008-09 Turkish Men's Volleyball League runner-up with Fenerbahçe SK
 2008-09 CEV Champions League Top 16 with Fenerbahçe SK
 2009-10 Balkan Cup Champion with Fenerbahçe SK
 2009-10 Turkish Men's Volleyball League Champion with Fenerbahçe SK
 2010-11 Turkish Volleyball Super Cup runner-up with Fenerbahçe
 2010-11 Turkish Volleyball Cup runner-up with Fenerbahçe
 2010-11 Turkish Men's Volleyball League Champion with Fenerbahçe SK
 2011-12 Turkish Men's Volleyball League Champion with Fenerbahçe
 2011-12 Turkish Volleyball Cup Champion with Fenerbahçe
 2011-12 Turkish Volleyball Super Cup Champion with Fenerbahçe
 2012-13 Turkish Volleyball Super Cup Champion with Fenerbahçe
 2013-14 Balkan Cup Champion with Fenerbahçe SK
 2013-14 Turkish Volleyball Cup runner-up with Fenerbahçe
 2013-14 Turkish Men's Volleyball League runner-up with Fenerbahçe SK
 2013-14 CEV Challenge Cup Champion with Fenerbahçe
 2014-15 Turkish Volleyball Super Cup runner-up with Fenerbahçe

References

External links
Player profile at fenerbahce.org
Personal web-page

1985 births
Living people
Volleyball players from Istanbul
Turkish men's volleyball players
Fenerbahçe volleyballers
Arçelik volleyballers
Turkish expatriate sportspeople in Germany
Expatriate volleyball players in Germany
Turkish expatriate volleyball players
Universiade medalists in volleyball
Universiade gold medalists for Turkey
Medalists at the 2005 Summer Universiade
21st-century Turkish people
Setters (volleyball)